Gala Abu Ahmed is a fortress ruin in lower Wadi Howar, northern Sudan. The fort was discovered in 1984 by archaeologists from the University of Cologne. It dates to the Napatan phase (ca. 750-350 BC) of the Kingdom of Kush. Radiocarbon dating  suggests that the fortress was already in use around 1100 BC. The function of the building is still unclear.

References
 J. Eger; J. Helmbold-Doyé; T. Karberg: Osttor und Vorwerk der Festung Gala Abu Ahmed. Bericht über die archäologischen Arbeiten der Kampagnen 2008/09 und 2009. In: Der Antike Sudan. Mitteilungen der Sudanarchäologischen Gesellschaft Bd. 21. 2010, S. 71-85. (German language)
 D. Eigner; F. Jesse: "Im Westen viel Neues - Die Grabungen 2008/09 in der Festung Gala Abu Ahmed". In: Der Antike Sudan Bd. 20. 2009, S. 141-158. (German language)
 F. Jesse: "Cattle, sherds and mighty walls. The Wadi Howar from Neolithic to Kushite times". In: Sudan & Nubia Bd. 10. 2006, S. 43-54.
 F. Jesse; R. Kuper: "Gala Abu Ahmed - Eine Festung am Wadi Howar". In: Der Antike Sudan Bd. 15. 2004, S. 137-42. (German language)
 F. Jesse; R. Peters: "Petroglyphs under the sand - A preliminary report on the field season 2008/09 at the fortress Gala Abu Ahmed". In: Sudan & Nubia Bd. 13. 2009, S. 62-71.
 A. Lohwasser: "Die Kleinfunde aus Gala Abu Ahmed im unteren Wadi Howar". In: Der Antike Sudan Bd. 15. 2004, S. 143-167. (German language)

Archaeological sites in Sudan